People...Hold On is the second album by former Temptations vocalist Eddie Kendricks. Released in May 1972 on the Tamla imprint of Motown Records, it was arranged by David Leacraft, David Van De Pitte and Leroy Fleming. The cover photography was by Weldon Arthur McDougal III.

It would prove to be his breakout album. "Girl You Need A Change of Mind" was one of the first disco/dance records. Album sales began to build rapidly especially in New York, Philadelphia, and Washington, D.C. Because of its length (7:33 min.), Motown released an edited version for radio. The album had been out for over six months before the radio caught on. But it eventually rose to number 13 R&B in the early months of 1973. Its success in the clubs would lay the groundwork for his upcoming number 1 Pop & R&B smash, "Keep On Truckin'".

Track listing
"If You Let Me" (Frank Wilson) 3:10 
"Let Me Run Into Your Lonely Heart" (Anita Poree, Frank Wilson) 2:59
"Day By Day" (Leonard Caston Jr., Terri McFaddin)  3:07
"Girl You Need a Change of Mind" (Anita Poree, Leonard Caston Jr.)  7:30 
"Someday We'll Have a Better World" (Norma Toney) 3:35
"My People...Hold On" (Anita Poree, Leonard Caston Jr.)  5:40
"Date with the Rain" (Bobby Miller) 2:42
"Eddie's Love" (Anita Poree, Leonard Caston Jr.)  3:20
"I'm on the Sideline" (Penelope McClendon)  2:56 	
"Just Memories" (Anita Poree, Leonard Caston Jr.) 5:50

Personnel
The Young Senators - rhythm
Cal Harris - Moog synthesizer
David Leacraft, David Van De Pitte, Leroy Fleming - arrangements

Charts

Singles

References

External links
 Eddie Kendricks-People ... Hold On at Discogs

1972 albums
Eddie Kendricks albums
Tamla Records albums
Albums produced by Frank Wilson (musician)